Söbüce, Korkuteli is a village in the District of Korkuteli, Antalya Province, Turkey.

The village is 110 km away from Antalya city center, and 90 km away from Döşemealtı. The climate of the village is similar to the Mediterranean climate.

Economy
The economy of Söbüce is largely agrarian. Animal breeding is also popular within the village.

Infrastructure
There is no primary school in the village. There is a drinking water network, however there is no sewerage. Hospitals and doctors offices are completely absent. The road that provides access to the neighborhood is asphalt. There are no telephone lines.

References

Villages in Korkuteli District